Brent Hsu, born Hsu Ming-chieh (born 12 May 1993), is a Taiwanese actor and singer. He was a member of the boyband SpeXial from 2012 to 2020.

Biography 
Hsu Ming-chieh was born in Taipei, Taiwan on 12 May 1993. His mother, Hsu Xianji, is an opera singer. He attended and graduated from Taipei City University of Science and Technology. Hsu debuted as a singer in 2012, after being scouted on the street with his friend Sam Lin, and became one of the four founding members of the boyband SpeXial, alongside Wes, Wayne, and Sam. Later that year, Huang debuted as an actor with a main role in the drama KO One Return. In the following years, he continued appearing in web series and movies, mostly with his bandmates.

In December 2014, Hsu temporarily left SpeXial in order to fulfill his mandatory military service. He was absent for the release of the group's first extended play, Love Killah, as well as the first SpeXial fan meeting at the National Taiwan University Sports Center.

He finished his military service on 10 December 2015 and rejoined the group on 24 January 2016, during the presentation of SpeXial at the KKBox Music Awards, where they performed the songs Love Guardian, Dangerous and Silly Girl, respectively.

Filmography

Television

References

External links 

 Official web site

1993 births
Living people
Taiwanese male television actors
21st-century Taiwanese male actors
21st-century Taiwanese male singers
Taiwanese pop singers
Taiwanese idols
Taipei City University of Science and Technology alumni